Cash and Carry (or "Inspect and Pay") wholesale represents a type of operation within the wholesale sector.

Overview
The main features of cash and carry are summarized best by the following definitions:

Cash and carry is a form of trade in which goods are sold from a wholesale warehouse operated either on a self-service basis or on the basis of samples (with the customer selecting from specimen articles using a manual or computerized ordering system but not serving themselves) or a combination of the two.
Customers (retailers, professional users, caterers, institutional buyers, etc.) settle the invoice on the spot in cash and carry the goods away themselves.
There are significant differences between "classical" sales at the wholesale stage and the cash and carry wholesaler: namely cash and carry customers arrange the transport of the goods themselves and pay for the goods on the spot, rather than on credit.
Access to purchase at a cash and carry is typically limited to operators of bona fide businesses, and the general public are not admitted.

Though wholesalers buy primarily from manufacturers and sell mostly to retailers, industrial users and other wholesalers, they also perform many value added functions. The wholesaler, an intermediary, is used based on principles of specialization and division of labor as well as contractual efficiency.

In a retail context, the term has a similar meaning: customers pay cash for the goods they purchase (the retailer does not offer credit accounts) and carry them away themselves (the retailer does not offer delivery service).

The first textbook on wholesaling, Wholesaling Principles and Practice (1937) by Beckman and Engle, notes that the "During the era of rapid change in the field of wholesaling which began in the middle of the twenties, the cash and carry wholesale house was ushered in."

Lawrence Batley is widely accredited as the originator of the concept in the UK.  However, research on the evolution of grocery wholesaling in Ireland by Dr Jim Quinn at Trinity College Dublin notes that the first report of a UK cash and carry was in June 1957 when The Grocer announced that a cash and carry warehouse had been opened in Ramsgate by Vye & Son a subsidiary of the Home & Colonial Group. The new service was called Wiseway and a range of own brands was being developed.  In April 1958 L. Batley & Co. of Huddersfield opened a large 30,000 sq. ft. modern Cash & Carry warehouse by far the biggest of its kind to date.

See also
 Warehouse club

References 

Wholesaling
Cash